The PSA World Tour 2010 is the international squash tour organised circuit organized by the Professional Squash Association (PSA) for the 2010 squash season. The most important tournament in the series is the World Open held in Saudi Arabia. The tour features three categories of regular events, Super Series, which feature the highest prize money and the best fields, Stars Tournament and Challenger. The Tour is concluded by the PSA Super Series Finals, the end of season championship for the top 8 rated players.

2010 Calendar

Key

World Open

Super Series
Prize money: $92,500 and more

Stars
Prize money: between $25,000 (2&1/2 Stars) and $50,000 (5 Stars)

January

February

March

April

July

September

October

November

Year end world top 10 players

Retirements
Following is a list of notable players (winners of a main tour title, and/or part of the PSA World Rankings top 30 for at least one month) who announced their retirement from professional squash, became inactive, or were permanently banned from playing, during the 2010 season:

 Renan Lavigne (born 1 November 1974 in Longjumeau, France) joined the pro tour in 1996, reached the singles no. 17 spot in October 2004. He won 9 PSA World Tour titles including Colombian Open in 2002 and the Comfort Inn Open in 2006. He retired after losing in the first round of the Saudi World Open in December 2010.

See also
PSA Super Series 2010
PSA World Tour
PSA World Rankings
PSA World Series Finals
PSA World Open
WISPA World Tour 2010

References

External links
PSA World Tour

 
PSA World Tour seasons
2010 in squash